Minsk was one of six  destroyer leaders built for the Soviet Navy during the 1930s, one of the three Project 38 variants. Completed in 1939, the ship was assigned to the Baltic Fleet and played a minor role in the Winter War against Finland in 1939–1940. After the start of Operation Barbarossa, the German invasion of the Soviet Union in June 1941, Minsk covered minelaying operations and provided naval gunfire support to Soviet units. She escorted ships during the Soviet evacuation of Tallinn, Estonia, in late August. The ship was sunk by German dive bombers on 23 September, although her wreck was salvaged in 1942 and repaired. Minsk was recommissioned in 1943 but the repairs were not completed until the following year. The ship was reclassified as a training ship in 1951, then became a target ship in 1958 and was sunk that year.

Design and description
Their crew numbered 250 officers and sailors in peacetime and 311 in wartime.

As built, the Leningrad-class ships mounted five  B-13 guns in two pairs of superfiring single mounts fore and aft of the superstructure and another mount between the bridge and the forward funnel. The guns were protected by gun shields. Anti-aircraft defense was provided by a pair of  34-K AA guns in single mounts on the aft superstructure and a pair of  21-K AA guns mounted on either side of the bridge as well as six  DShK machine guns. They carried eight  torpedo tubes in two rotating quadruple mounts; each tube was provided with a reload. The ships could also carry a maximum of either 68 or 115 mines and 52 depth charges. They were fitted with a set of Arktur hydrophones for anti-submarine work.

Modifications
During the war, Minsk exchanged her two 21-K mounts for six  70-K AA guns. She received a British Type 128 ASDIC system and was fitted with a Type 291 early-warning radar. After the war, all of the 76- and 37-millimeter guns were replaced by a dozen water-cooled V-11M versions of the 70-K gun in twin mounts. During the 1950s, the radars were replaced by Top Bow, EWS Top, Plum Jar and Ball End radars and the pole foremast was replaced by a tripod mast to support them.

Construction and career
Minsk, named after the capital of Belorussia, was laid down on 5 October 1934 at Shipyard No. 190 (Zhdanov) in Leningrad as yard number 471 and launched on 6 November 1935. Commissioned on 10 November 1938, she was assigned to the Red Banner Baltic Fleet in February 1939. She sailed to Tallinn on 22 October when the Soviet Union began to occupy Estonia. After the Winter War began on 30 November, Minsk and her sister ship  bombarded Finnish coastal defenses on Saarenpää Island, part of the Beryozovye Islands, on 10 December and again on 30 December 1939 – 3 January 1940; Minsk bombarded them by herself on 18–19 December as well. She was badly damaged by a storm in September and under repair until 17 June 1941.

The beginning of Operation Barbarossa five days later, found Minsk in Tallinn as part of the 5th Destroyer Division and she was ordered to cover mine-laying operations at the entrance to the Gulf of Finland between Hanko and Osmussaar on 23–27 June. On 3 July she helped to lay minefield covering the approached to Tallinn. The ship bombarded German positions around Tallinn on 23–27 August, firing 563 shells from her main guns. One of those guns was struck by a German shell on 27 August. That night, the Soviets began evacuating the port, covered by Minsk, flying the flag of Rear Admiral Y. A. Panteleyev, the fleet chief of staff. The ship continued to provide gunfire support until all of the evacuees were loaded by the morning of 28 August. Later that night, a mine detonated in one of her paravanes, damaging the ship's hull.

Junkers Ju 87 dive-bombers of StG 2 attacked the ships in Kronstadt harbor on 23 September. Minsk was initially hit with three  bombs that knocked out all her power, set her on fire and flooded part of the ship. She drifted until her stern grounded near the Leningrad lighthouse, although she was pulled off by tugboats and towed to the harbor. Minsk sank in shallow water later that night. She was refloated in August 1942 and received temporary repairs at the Kronstadt Marine Plant. The ship steamed under her own power to Shipyard No. 190 on 9 November for permanent repairs. Minsk was recommissioned on 22 June 1943, although her repairs were not official completed until 28 August 1944.

She continued to serve with the Baltic Fleet postwar and was reclassified as a destroyer on 12 January 1949 like her surviving sister ships. Minsk was converted into a training ship of the Dzerzhinsky Higher Naval Engineering School in Leningrad on 31 July 1951. She was reclassified an unpowered training ship on 8 April 1953, renamed Chorokh on 13 December 1954, then UTS-14 on 27 December 1956. The vessel was struck from the Navy List on 3 April 1958, turned into a floating target on 22 April and sunk later that year during testing of new missiles in the Gulf of Finland near the island of Maly Tyuters.

References

Bibliography

Further reading

External links 
 Minsk photo gallery at navsource.narod.ru

Leningrad-class destroyer leaders
Ships built in the Soviet Union
1935 ships
World War II destroyers of the Soviet Union
Destroyers sunk by aircraft
Ships sunk by German aircraft
Maritime incidents in September 1941